The Ministry of Health of the Republic of Somaliland  is a ministry of government of Somaliland that is responsible for health system, it's also responsible for proposing and executing government policy of health. the current minister is Omar Ali Abdillahi.

Overview

Female Genital Mutilation (FGM) is a major problem in Somaliland with a prevalence close to 98%.
Somaliland has one of the worst maternal mortality ratios in the world, estimated to be between 1400 and 1000 per 100,000 live births. Life expectancy at birth is between 47 and 57 years. The infant mortality rate is 90/1000 while the under- five mortality is about 145/1000. Fully immunized child is a mere 5%. Environmental sanitation is highly challenged. The top 10 leading causes of morbidity are mainly the preventable and curable infectious diseases.

Departments

 Policy & Planning Department
 Human Resources for Health Department
 Research & Statistics Department
 Procurement & Supply Department

Ministers of Health
 Osman Kassim Kodah
 Abdilahi Husein Iman Darawal
 Abdi Haybe Mohamed
 Hussein Mohamed Mohamoud
 Suleiman Haglotosiye
 Hassan Ismail Yusuf
 Omar Ali Abdillahi

References

External links
 Ministry of Health of Somaliland

Politics of Somaliland
Government ministries of Somaliland